Straughan is a surname and may refer to:

Jane Straughan (1913–2007), American aviator and Women Airforce Service Pilot from 1942 to 1944
Paulin Tay Straughan (born 1963), Singaporean academic and Nominated Member of Parliament
Peter Straughan (born 1968), English playwright and author